Tropic of Ice (Jään kääntöpiiri) is a Finnish spy film shot in Helsinki, Olavinlinna and London. It was directed by Lauri Törhönen and released in 1987.  It was produced by Kaj Holmberg and the production company was Skandia-Filmi Oy.

Credited cast
 

Tor Planting... Kai Friman
Raimo Hallama... father
Soli Labbart...mother
Mats Dumell... brother
Marja-Leena Kouki... brother'wife
Marjut Kauppinen... brother's daughter
Annikki Viitala... Friman's secretary
Johanna Raunio... Claire
Sarah Lam... Louise
Irmeli Kangaspunta... Natasha
Vladimir von Witte... Sergei
Victor Thorne... David Jordan
William Carson... captain Charles Montgomery, "Charlie", American embassy military attaché
Neil Hardwick... Gottfried, Commercial Adviser to the Embassy of the Federal Republic of Germany
Stig Framåt... reader
Tim Steffa... John
Alan Tilvern... old manager of an American company
John Michael Paliotti... new manager of an American company
Emily Rose Pat, secretary of American company
Leon Herbert... robber in London
Patrick Ward... robber in London
Taneli Mäkelä... men with pistol
David Barnes... London taxi driver
Igor Turtschaninoff... Soviet Deputy Minister
Svetlana Mäkelä... Head of the Soviet Trade Commission
Zofia Grodzinska... translator
Georg Pavloff... Neuvostoliiton suurlähetystön edustaja
Juha Siltanen... Political Assistant to the Soviet Embassy
Heinrich Bremer...German engineer
Ibragim Aliev... Turkish technician
Yoji Kasajima...old Japanese businessman
Hannele Törrönen... doctor
Julia Stepelton... Geraldine Johnson, Commercial Representative of the US Embassy
Eddy Hawkins... US State Department Representative on TV
Peter Abbott... owner of a London hotel
Henry Martin... London Hotel Porter
Peter Harborne... English engineer
Malcolm Beddard... English economist
Mikhail Prohorov... Soviet officer
Mikhail Dzougoutov... Soviet officer
Väinö Haukka ... Soviet officer
Christina Hartmann... flight officer
Henri Purola... pastor
Ulla Tyhjälä... cantor
Antti Horko... customs officer
Juuso Juntunen... photographer
Maarit Oravala... father's girlfriend
Jouni Flinkkilä... newsreader
Pirjo Kauppinen... Radio 1 reporter
Leila Kataja... Swimming pool waiter
Jari Järvimaa... chauffeur
Juhani Maukonen... chauffeur
Jaakko Park... Jack, parrot

References

External links
IMDb Profile

1987 films
1980s spy thriller films
1987 thriller films
Finnish thriller films
1980s Finnish-language films
Films shot in Finland
Films shot in the United Kingdom